The Gate Theatre was an Off-Broadway theatre in New York City that was active during the 1950s through 1970s. Located at 162 Second Avenue in the East Village, the theatre was founded in 1957 by Lily Turner.  It closed in the early 1970s.

References

External links
 The Gate Theater by Aldo Tambellini
 The Gate Theatre at the Off-Broadway Database

Off-Broadway theaters
1957 establishments in New York City
1970s disestablishments in New York (state)